Timothy Logan (born 16 August 1953) is a New Zealand rower.

Logan was born in 1953 in Wellington, New Zealand. He was a member of Petone Rowing Club. He represented New Zealand at the 1976 Summer Olympics. He is listed as New Zealand Olympian athlete number 357 by the New Zealand Olympic Committee.

References

1953 births
Living people
New Zealand male rowers
Rowers at the 1976 Summer Olympics
Olympic rowers of New Zealand
Rowers from Wellington City
World Rowing Championships medalists for New Zealand